Vancouver City was a provincial electoral district in the Canadian province of British Columbia.  It was a multiple member riding based in the newly created city of Vancouver.

It did not appear on the hustings until the 1890 election - the city only having been chartered and named in the year of the previous election when the locality was a small polling area of the New Westminster (provincial electoral district) riding.  It is a sign of Vancouver's rapid growth that by 1890 there were over 300 electors, by 1900 there were 15,000, by 1903 over 25,000 votes cast; prior to 1885 the population of the waterside village of Granville, B.I. (Burrard Inlet, a postal address shared by Moodyville, New Brighton and Barnet) had been in the range of 300.  When the riding was created it was a two-member riding but because of population increase was made a three-member riding in 1890 and in 1903 a five-member seat.  Under the Block Voting system in use, each voter had right to cast as many votes as there were seats to fill.

By 1920 Vancouver having grown to 200,000 inhabitants, the district became a six-member seat with about 40,000 voting, and over 200,000 votes cast.

When it was broken up after the 1928 election, it became four ridings, three with two members (Vancouver-Burrard, Vancouver Centre and Vancouver East and one with three members (Vancouver-Point Grey.

Demographics

Political Geography and History 

Vancouver City was a multi seat district, electing from two to six MLAs, before being dismantled in 1928.

Each voter could cast as many votes as there were seats to fill in the district.

In most of the elections from 1903, when party labels were first used formally, to 1920, the Block Voting system in use meant that one party took all of the city's seats. But in most cases, that one party took less than half the votes.

From 1903 to 1912, the Conservative party took all of the Vancouver City seats each time, with the most popular Conservative candidate taking less than 11 percent of votes cast.

In 1916 and 1920, the Liberal party took five of Vancouver City's six seats, with a Conservatives taking one seat.

In 1924, the Liberal party took five of Vancouver City's six seats, with a "Provincial Party" candidate taking one seat.

In 1928, the Conservative party took all six of Vancouver City's seats.

Following the 1928 election, Vancouver City was converted into four new districts, electing a total of 9 MLAs.

Notable elections

Notable MLAs 
Joe Martin, aka "Fighting Joe"
Charles A. Woodward, founder of Woodward's and father of W.C. "Billy" Woodward, later Lieutenant-Governor, and grandfather of Charles N. "Chunky" Woodward.

Electoral history 
Note: winners in each election in bold.

|Independent
|James Welton Horne 3
|align="right"|695	
|align="right"|22.33%
|align="right"|
|align="right"|unknown

|Independent
|Robert Garnett Tatlow
|align="right"|478 	
|align="right"|15.35%
|align="right"|
|align="right"|unknown
|- bgcolor="white"
!align="right" colspan=3|Total valid votes
!align="right"|3,113
!align="right"|100.00%
!align="right"|
|- bgcolor="white"
!align="right" colspan=3|Total rejected ballots
!align="right"|
!align="right"|
!align="right"|
|- bgcolor="white"
!align="right" colspan=3|Turnout
!align="right"|%
!align="right"|
!align="right"|
|- bgcolor="white"
!align="right" colspan=7|1 Vancouver publisher (Vancouver Province newspaper) and mayoral contender
|- bgcolor="white"
!align="right" colspan=7|2 Landowner at "Greer's Beach", now Kitsilano Beach.
|- bgcolor="white"
!align="right" colspan=7|3 Promoter of the "Great Land Sale" in 1891 in Mission City
|}

|Independents
|Samuel Greer
|align="right"|208 	
|align="right"|2.56%
|align="right"|
|align="right"|unknown

|- bgcolor="white"
!align="right" colspan=3|Total valid votes
!align="right"|8,127
!align="right"|100.00%
!align="right"|
|- bgcolor="white"
!align="right" colspan=3|Total rejected ballots
!align="right"|
!align="right"|
!align="right"|
|- bgcolor="white"
!align="right" colspan=3|Turnout
!align="right"|%
!align="right"|
!align="right"|
|}

|- bgcolor="white"
!align="right" colspan=3|Total valid votes
!align="right"|10,636
!align="right"|100.00%
!align="right"|
|- bgcolor="white"
!align="right" colspan=3|Total rejected ballots
!align="right"|
!align="right"|
!align="right"|
|- bgcolor="white"
!align="right" colspan=3|Turnout
!align="right"|%
!align="right"|
!align="right"|
|}

|-

|Conservative
|William John Bowser
|align="right"|3,152 	
|align="right"|10.45%
|align="right"|
|align="right"|unknown

|Liberal
|John Wallace deBeque Farris
|align="right"|2,096 	
|align="right"|6.95%
|align="right"|
|align="right"|unknown

|Conservative
|James Ford Garden
|align="right"|3,080 		
|align="right"|10.21%
|align="right"|
|align="right"|unknown

|Liberal
|Alexander Henderson
|align="right"|2,248 	
|align="right"|7.45%
|align="right"|
|align="right"|unknown

|Conservative
|Alexander Henry Boswell MacGowan
|align="right"|3,141 	 	
|align="right"|10.41%
|align="right"|
|align="right"|unknown

|Conservative
|George Albert McGuire
|align="right"|2,994 	
|align="right"|9.92%
|align="right"|
|align="right"|unknown

|Liberal
|William Wallace Burns McInnes
|align="right"|2,233 		
|align="right"|7.40%
|align="right"|
|align="right"|unknown

|Liberal
|Robert Purvis McLennan
|align="right"|2,316 	
|align="right"|7.68%
|align="right"|
|align="right"|unknown

|Liberal]
|Thomas Fletcher Neelands
|align="right"|2,063 	
|align="right"|6.84%
|align="right"|
|align="right"|unknown

|Canadian Labour Party of BC
|Albert George Perry
|align="right"|281 	
|align="right"|0.93%
|align="right"|
|align="right"|unknown

|Conservative
|Robert Garnet Tatlow 6
|align="right"|3,136 	 	
|align="right"|10.39%
|align="right"|
|align="right"|unknown

|Canadian Labour Party of BC
|Francis Williams
|align="right"|401 		
|align="right"|1.33%
|align="right"|
|align="right"|unknown
|- bgcolor="white"
!align="right" colspan=3|Total valid votes
!align="right"|30,173
!align="right"|100.00%
!align="right"|
|- bgcolor="white"
!align="right" colspan=3|Total rejected ballots
!align="right"|
!align="right"|
!align="right"|
|- bgcolor="white"
!align="right" colspan=3|Turnout
!align="right"|%
!align="right"|
!align="right"|
|- bgcolor="white"
!align="right" colspan=7|6 spelled Garnet on this ballot, Garnett in other years
|}

1909 election 

|-

|Conservative
|William John Bowser
|align="right"|5,441 	
|align="right"|10.60%
|align="right"|
|align="right"|unknown

|Liberal
|John Bell Campbell
|align="right"|3,227 		
|align="right"|6.29%
|align="right"|
|align="right"|unknown

|Liberal
|George Ernest MacDonald
|align="right"|3,984 	
|align="right"|7.76%
|align="right"|
|align="right"|unknown

|Conservative
|Alexander Henry Boswell MacGowan
|align="right"|3,141 	 	
|align="right"|10.41%
|align="right"|
|align="right"|unknown

|Conservative
|George Albert McGuire
|align="right"|4,826 	 	
|align="right"|9.41%
|align="right"|
|align="right"|unknown

|Liberal
|John Harold Senkler
|align="right"|4,110 	 	
|align="right"|8.01%
|align="right"|
|align="right"|unknown

|Liberal
|James Stables
|align="right"|3,356 	 	 	
|align="right"|6.54%
|align="right"|
|align="right"|unknown

|Conservative]
|Charles Edward Tisdall
|align="right"|2,063 	
|align="right"|6.84%
|align="right"|
|align="right"|unknown

|Liberal
|Frederick Coate Wade
|align="right"|3,942 	
|align="right"|7.68%
|align="right"|
|align="right"|unknown

|Conservative]
|Henry Holgate Watson
|align="right"|5,202 	 	
|align="right"|10.14%
|align="right"|
|align="right"|unknown
|- bgcolor="white"
!align="right" colspan=3|Total valid votes
!align="right"|51,316
!align="right"|100.00%
!align="right"|
|- bgcolor="white"
!align="right" colspan=3|Total rejected ballots
!align="right"|
!align="right"|
!align="right"|
|- bgcolor="white"
!align="right" colspan=3|Turnout
!align="right"|%
!align="right"|
!align="right"|
|}

|-

|Conservative
|William John Bowser
|align="right"|5,101 	
|align="right"|11.02%
|align="right"|
|align="right"|unknown

|Liberal
|Cameron William Smith
|align="right"|2,716 	 		
|align="right"|5.87%
|align="right"|
|align="right"|unknown

|Liberal
|Joseph Nealon Ellis
|align="right"|2,619 	
|align="right"|5.66%
|align="right"|
|align="right"|unknown

|Liberal
|Charles William Enright
|align="right"|2,947 	
|align="right"|6.37%
|align="right"|
|align="right"|unknown

|Independent
|Samuel Greer
|align="right"|897 	
|align="right"|1.94%
|align="right"|
|align="right"|unknown

|Conservative
|Alexander Henry Boswell MacGowan
|align="right"|5,061 		
|align="right"|10.93%
|align="right"|
|align="right"|unknown

|Conservative
|George Albert McGuire
|align="right"|5,114 	
|align="right"|11.05%
|align="right"|
|align="right"|unknown

|Liberal
|Ralph Smith
|align="right"|3,257 		 	
|align="right"|7.04%
|align="right"|
|align="right"|unknown

|Liberal
|William Maxwell Smith
|align="right"|2,744 		 	
|align="right"|5.93%
|align="right"|
|align="right"|unknown

|Conservative
|Charles Edward Tisdall
|align="right"|5,085 		
|align="right"|10.97%
|align="right"|
|align="right"|unknown

|Conservative
|Henry Holgate Watson
|align="right"|4,977 		 	
|align="right"|10.75%
|align="right"|
|align="right"|unknown
|- bgcolor="white"
!align="right" colspan=3|Total valid votes
!align="right"|46,285
!align="right"|100.00%
!align="right"|
|- bgcolor="white"
!align="right" colspan=3|Total rejected ballots
!align="right"|
!align="right"|
!align="right"|
|- bgcolor="white"
!align="right" colspan=3|Turnout
!align="right"|%
!align="right"|
!align="right"|
|}

|-

|Conservative
|William John Bowser
|align="right"|7,818 	 	 	
|align="right"|4.12%

|Canadian Labour Party
|Wilfred Harry Cottrell
|align="right"|6,314 	
|align="right"|3.33%

|Canadian Labour Party
|William Dunn
|align="right"|5,752 	
|align="right"|3.03%
|align="right"|
|align="right"|unknown

|Liberal
|John Wallace deBeque Farris
|align="right"|8,427 		 	
|align="right"|4.44%
|align="right"|
|align="right"|unknown

|Conservative
|Samuel Lyness Howe
|align="right"|7,250 					
|align="right"|3.82%
|align="right"|
|align="right"|unknown

|Conservative
|Thomas Henry Kirk
|align="right"|7,686 						
|align="right"|4.05%
|align="right"|
|align="right"|unknown

|Canadian Labour Party
|Angus McInnis
|align="right"|5,897 	
|align="right"|3.11%
|align="right"|
|align="right"|unknown

|Liberal
|Ian Alistair MacKenzie
|align="right"|9,476 	
|align="right"|4.99%
|align="right"|
|align="right"|unknown

|Liberal
|Christopher McRae
|align="right"|9,778 		
|align="right"|5.15%
|align="right"|
|align="right"|unknown

|Conservative
|Royal Lethington Maitland
|align="right"|8,417 				 	
|align="right"|4.44%
|align="right"|
|align="right"|unknown

|Canadian Labour Party
|Edmund Henry Morrison
|align="right"|5,613 	
|align="right"|2.96%
|align="right"|
|align="right"|unknown

|Liberal
|Victor Wentworth Odlum
|align="right"|10,011 		
|align="right"|5.28%
|align="right"|
|align="right"|unknown

|Conservative
|Perry Douglas Roe
|align="right"|7,222 				
|align="right"|3.81%
|align="right"|
|align="right"|unknown

|Conservative
|Emma Wood Scott
|align="right"|7,292 	
|align="right"|3.84%
|align="right"|
|align="right"|unknown

|Liberal
|Mary Ellen Smith
|align="right"|9,251 		 		
|align="right"|4.88%
|align="right"|
|align="right"|unknown

|Canadian Labour Party
|Priscilla Janet Smith
|align="right"|6,078 				
|align="right"|3.20%
|align="right"|
|align="right"|unknown

|Liberal
|Charles Woodward
|align="right"|11,318 		 			 	
|align="right"|5.97%
|align="right"|
|align="right"|unknown
|- bgcolor="white"
!align="right" colspan=3|Total valid votes
!align="right"|189,728
!align="right"|100.00%
!align="right"|
|- bgcolor="white"
!align="right" colspan=3|Total rejected ballots
!align="right"|
!align="right"|
!align="right"|
|- bgcolor="white"
!align="right" colspan=3|Turnout
!align="right"|%
!align="right"|
!align="right"|
|}

|-

|Liberal
|Henry Elston Almond
|align="right"|11,818 	 	 	 	
|align="right"|6.56%
|align="right"|
|align="right"|unknown

|Conservative
|William Dick
|align="right"|15,968 	
|align="right"|8.86%
|align="right"|
|align="right"|unknown

|Liberal
|Dugald Donaghy
|align="right"|13,176 	
|align="right"|7.31%
|align="right"|
|align="right"|unknown

|Liberal
|John Pitcairn Hogg
|align="right"|10,948 	 	 	 	
|align="right"|6.08%
|align="right"|
|align="right"|unknown

|Conservative
|Thomas Henry Kirk
|align="right"|15,943 						
|align="right"|8.85%
|align="right"|
|align="right"|unknown

|Independent Labour Party
|Angus McInnis
|align="right"|6,026 	
|align="right"|3.34%
|align="right"|
|align="right"|unknown

|Conservative
|Royal Lethington Maitland
|align="right"|16,499 					 	
|align="right"|9.16%
|align="right"|
|align="right"|unknown

|Conservative
|William Curtis Shelly
|align="right"|17,486 						
|align="right"|9.70%
|align="right"|
|align="right"|unknown

|Independent Labour Party
|Robert Skinner
|align="right"|4,223 	 	
|align="right"|2.34%
|align="right"|
|align="right"|unknown

|Liberal
|Helen Douglas Smith
|align="right"|12,514 		 	
|align="right"|6.94%
|align="right"|
|align="right"|unknown

|Conservative
|Nelson Spencer
|align="right"|16,717 					
|align="right"|9.28%
|align="right"|
|align="right"|unknown

|Liberal
|Frederick William Sterling
|align="right"|11,045 	 		 	 	
|align="right"|6.13%
|align="right"|
|align="right"|unknown

|Liberal
|Nicholas Thompson
|align="right"|11,101 	 			
|align="right"|6.16%
|align="right"|
|align="right"|unknown

|Conservative
|George Alexander Walkem
|align="right"|15,769 		
|align="right"|8.75%
|align="right"|
|align="right"|unknown
|- bgcolor="white"
!align="right" colspan=3|Total valid votes
!align="right"|180,209
!align="right"|100.00%
!align="right"|
|- bgcolor="white"
!align="right" colspan=3|Total rejected ballots
!align="right"|425
!align="right"|
!align="right"|
|- bgcolor="white"
!align="right" colspan=3|Turnout
!align="right"|%
!align="right"|
!align="right"|
|}

Vancouver City last appeared in the 1928 election.  For the 1933 general election Vancouver City was redistributed into:

Vancouver-Burrard
Vancouver Centre
Vancouver East
Vancouver-Point Grey

References

Former provincial electoral districts of British Columbia